Aspermont Independent School District is a public school district based in Aspermont, Texas (USA).  The district is located in Stonewall County.

History

On July 1, 1985, Old Glory Independent School District merged into Aspermont ISD.

Finances
As of the 2010–2011 school year, the appraised valuation of property in the district was $216,602,000. The maintenance tax rate was $0.104 and the bond tax rate was $0.000 per $100 of appraised valuation.

Academic achievement
In 2011, the school district was rated "recognized" by the Texas Education Agency.  Thirty-five percent of districts in Texas in 2011 received the same rating. No state accountability ratings will be given to districts in 2012. A school district in Texas can receive one of four possible rankings from the Texas Education Agency: Exemplary (the highest possible ranking), Recognized, Academically Acceptable, and Academically Unacceptable (the lowest possible ranking).

Historical district TEA accountability ratings
2011: Recognized
2010: Exemplary
2009: Recognized
2008: Recognized
2007: Recognized
2006: Recognized
2005: Recognized
2004: Recognized

Schools
In the 2011–2012 school year, the district had students in two schools. 
Aspermont Junior High and High School (Grades 7-12)
Aspermont Elementary School (Grades PK-6)

Special programs

Athletics
Aspermont High School participates in the boys sports of baseball, basketball, football, and wrestling. The school participates in the girls sports of basketball, softball, and volleyball. For the 2012 through 2014 school years, Aspermont High School will play six-man football in UIL Class 1A 6-man Football Division II.

See also

List of school districts in Texas
List of high schools in Texas

References

External links

Aspermont High School yearbooks hosted by the Portal to Texas History

School districts in Stonewall County, Texas